Plasmodium vautieri is a parasite of the genus Plasmodium subgenus Lacertamoeba. As in all species of the genus Plasmodium, P. vautieri has both vertebrate and insect hosts. The vertebrate hosts for this parasite are reptiles.

Taxonomy 
The parasite was first described by Pessoa and de Blasi in 1973.

Description 
The meronts give rise to 10-20 merozoites arranged in a rosette.

The meronts measure 4.8 - 7.5  x 3.5 - 6.0 microns.

Pigment granules are occur either as a central mass or at the edge of the cell.

The gametocytes are ovoid. There is no apparent difference between the male and female gametocytes.

The gametocytes measure 5.0 - 7.5 x 3.0 - 4.0

Distribution 
This species is found in Brazil, South America.

Hosts 

The only known host is the lizard Urostrophus vautieri.

References 

vautieri